A referendum on how many chambers the Legislative Assembly should have was held in Puerto Rico on July 10, 2005. The proposed change to a unicameral legislature was supported by 83.94% of those voting, although voter turnout was just 22.58%. However, another referendum would have to be held to approve the specific amendments to the constitution that are required for the change. The House of Representatives subsequently let the bill die, so the changes were not realised. Had the changes been approved, the legislature would have become unicameral from 2009 onwards.

Campaign
The Puerto Rican Independence Party supported the victorious "yes" vote in favor of one chamber. The Popular Democratic Party did not take an official stance on the matter, with its leadership supporting or opposing the measure. The New Progressive Party opposed the constitutional amendment under electoral review, but supported abstention from the vote.

Results

References

External links

State Commission of Elections of Puerto Rico

2005
2005 in Puerto Rico
2005 referendums
2005 ballot measures
2005 Puerto Rico elections
July 2005 events in North America